Dr. Sandeep Kumar Pathak is an Indian politician from Aam Aadmi Party and Rajya Sabha MP from Punjab since April 2022. He is a former assistant professor of IIT Delhi, former research associate at University of Oxford and MIT. He is also currently Aam Aadmi Party's Incharge in Gujarat & Co-incharge in Punjab and Himachal Pradesh

Early life and education 
He was born in Bataha village in Mungeli, Chhattisgarh to agriculturist parents. He completed his education till class 6th from his village and then moved to Bilaspur, Chhattisgarh to his aunt's house for further studies. He completed his masters in Chhattisgarh and then moved to Indian Institute of Chemical Technology, Hyderabad and National Chemical laboratory, Pune for further studies.

He then moved to the University of Cambridge to pursue Ph.D on high-temperature superconducting materials. Post that he pursued post-doctoral research as research associate in University of Oxford and MIT.

Professional career 
He joined the faculty of IIT Delhi in 2016. His area of work at the IIT is stated to be fabrication of perovskite-based photovoltaic devices, photo-physical properties and he has a number of research papers to his credit.

Political career 
He was recognized for his behind-the-scenes work in the 2022 Punjab elections, on behalf of the Aam Aadmi Party, and was nominated by the party as a candidate for a seat in the Rajya Sabha, to which he was elected, unopposed, in April 2022.

He was appointed Aam Aadmi Party's Incharge in Gujarat & Co-incharge in Punjab on 21 March 2022. Later he was appointed Co-incharge for Himachal Pradesh on 4 June 2022.

References

External links 

 Profile at National Portal of India
 Profile at IIT Delhi
 Profile at Google Scholar
 Profile at Twitter
 

  
  

Living people
Rajya Sabha members from Punjab, India
Aam Aadmi Party politicians from Punjab, India
Rajya Sabha members from Aam Aadmi Party
1979 births